Triplophysa strauchii, the Spotted thicklip loach, is a species of ray-finned fish in the genus Triplophysa. It is widespread in the basins of Balkhash, Issyk-Kul, Sassyk-Kul and Ala-Kul, and basins of Lake Zaysan, in Tarim basin.

References 

 

S
Fish of Central Asia
Freshwater fish of China
Taxa named by Karl Kessler
Fish described in 1874
Cyprinid fish of Asia